Garstang Road railway station served the hamlet of Stake Pool, Lancashire, England, from 1923 to 1930 on the Knott End branch of the London, Midland and Scottish Railway.

History 
The station opened in October 1923 by the London, Midland and Scottish Railway. It was situated on the east side of Garstang Road. There were seven initial services but when it opened, road traffic was already dwindling passenger numbers and when the bus services were introduced in the late 1920s, it was deemed uneconomic to continue so it closed on 31 March 1930. The track was lifted in 1963 but the waiting shelter was still extant.

References

External links 

Disused railway stations in the Borough of Wyre
Former London, Midland and Scottish Railway stations
Railway stations in Great Britain opened in 1923
Railway stations in Great Britain closed in 1930
1923 establishments in England
1930 disestablishments in England
Pilling